José Quijada may refer to:

José Quijada (baseball)
José Bernardino Quijada